Justice Holcomb may refer to:

Oscar Raymond Holcomb, associate justice and chief justice of the Washington Supreme Court
Silas A. Holcomb, associate justice and chief justice of the Nebraska Supreme Court